Salus Populi Romani (Protectress, or more literally health or salvation, of the Roman People) is a Roman Catholic title associated with the venerated image of the Blessed Virgin Mary in Rome.  This Byzantine icon of the Madonna and Child Jesus holding a Gospel book on a gold ground, now heavily overpainted, is kept in the Borghese (Pauline) Chapel of the Basilica of Saint Mary Major.

The image arrived in Rome in 590 A.D. during the reign of Pope Gregory I. Pope Gregory XVI granted the image a canonical coronation on 15 August 1838 through the papal bull Cælestis Regina. Pope Pius XII crowned the image again and ordered a public religious procession during the Marian year of 1 November 1954. The image was cleaned and restored by the Vatican Museum, then given a Pontifical Mass on 28 January 2018.

The phrase Salus Populi Romani goes back to the legal system and pagan rituals of the ancient Roman Republic. After the legalisation of Christianity by Emperor Constantine the Great through the Edict of Milan in 313 AD, the phrase was sanctioned as a Marian title for the Blessed Virgin Mary.

History 

The image is held to have arrived from Crete in the year 590 AD during the Pontificate of Pope Gregory the Great, who welcomed the image in person on its arrival borne with a floral boat from the Tiber river. For centuries it was placed above the door to the baptistery chapel of the Basilica of Santa Maria Maggiore (considered the third of the Roman patriarchal basilicas) where in the year 1240 it began to be called Regina Caeli (English: "Queen of Heaven") in an official document. Later it was moved to the nave, and from the 13th century it was preserved in a marble tabernacle. Since 1613 it has been located in the altar tabernacle of the Cappella Paolina that was built specifically for it, later known to English-speaking pilgrims as the Lady Chapel. The church and its Marian shrine are under the special patronage of the popes.

From at least the 15th century, it was honored as a miraculous image, and it was later used by the Jesuit Order in particular to foster devotion to the Mother of God through the Sodality of Our Lady movement.

The image is one of the so-called "Luke images"  believed to have been painted from real life by Saint Luke himself. According to the legend:

The Roman Breviary states, "After the Council of Ephesus (431) in which the Mother of Jesus was acclaimed as Mother of God, Pope Sixtus III erected at Rome on the Esquiline Hill, a basilica dedicated to the honor of the Holy Mother of God. It was afterward called Saint Mary Major and it is the oldest church in the West dedicated to the honor of the Blessed Virgin Mary."

The Roman Pontifical gives the following account:

Description 
 The image is five feet high by three and a quarter feet wide (117 x 79 cm) – very large for an icon, especially one with an early date. It is painted on a thick cedar panel. Mary wears a gold-trimmed, dark blue mantle over a purple/red tunic. The letters in Greek at the top identify Mary as "Mother of God" (Μήτηρ Θεοῦ in lower case and ΜHΤHΡ ΘΕΟΥ in upper case), as is usual in Byzantine art (Christ may originally have had an inscription under later re-painting). Christ is holding a book in his left hand, presumably a Gospel Book. His right hand is raised in a blessing, and it is Mary not he who looks directly out at the viewer. 
The folded together position of Mary's hands distinguishes this image as a version of the earlier type from before the development of the iconography of the Hodegetria image in the 10th century, where she points to Christ with her right hand. "Rather than offering the Child, she keeps his body closer to hers and seeks physical and tactile contact with him." However the few other examples of this type do not have the Virgin's hands folded together – the right hand holds Christ's knee.

The Virgin holding in her right hand a mappa (or mappula, a sort of embroidered ceremonial handkerchief), originally a consular symbol, later an imperial one, means this image is probably one of the type showing Mary as Regina coeli or "Queen of Heaven". In addition, the Virgin also wears a plain, golden, ring band in her middle finger of her right hand, later obscured by a gemstone. The image no longer wears its Canonical crowns and jeweled regalia, which has now been transferred in the treasury of the sacristy of Saint Peter’s Basilica.

Dating by art historians 
The image "has been confidently dated to almost every possible period between the fifth century and the thirteenth". The recent full-length study by Gerhard Wolf says, cautiously, that it is "probably Late Antique" in its original form.

The icon in its current state of overpainting seems to be a work of the 13th century (as witnessed by the features of the faces), but other layers visible under the top one suggest it is a repainting of a much earlier piece; especially revealing is the modeling of Child's right hand in the first layer, which can be compared to other early Christian icons that display 'Pompeian' illusionistic qualities. The areas of linear stylization, such as Christ's garment which is rendered in golden hatching producing a flat effect, seem to go back to the 8th century, and can be compared with a very early icon of Elijah from Mount Sinai. A second restoration process started around 1100 and came to an end in the 13th century. The Virgin's blue mantle which is wrapped over her purple dress was severely altered in the outline; the red halos are also not part of the original image.

The image type itself suggests it is not a medieval invention, but rather an Early Christian concept dating from antiquity: a majestic, half-length portrait showing a frank outward gaze of the rulerlike Virgin, with her upright, stately pose and folded hands gently clasping the Child, unique among all icons. Lively turning of the maturely developed and attired Child also attests to the painting's antiquity. The vivid contrapposto of the two bodies, which suggests direct observation, can be compared with a 5th-century Mount Sinai icon of the Virgin and Child in Kiev, and contrasted with the Pantheon Marian icon from 609, which already shows the Mother slightly subordinated to the Child by the imploring gesture and the turn of the head, and where the interaction of the bodies exists only in a flat plane. These comparisons suggest a date of the 7th century for the icon.

The early fame of the icon can be gauged from the production of replicas (a fresco in Santa Maria Antiqua seems to have reproduced it already in the 8th century), and the role it played in the ritual on the feast of the Virgin's Assumption, where the Acheiropoieta (the panel painting of Christ from the Lateran Basilica) was moved in a procession to Santa Maria Maggiore to 'meet' with it. Monneret de Villard has shown that engravings of this icon brought by Jesuits to Ethiopia influenced the art of that country from the 17th century onwards, repeating "every detail of her own and the Child's posture, the position of the hands being especially characteristic." More far flung apparent copies include a Moghul miniature, presumably based on a copy given to Akbar by the Jesuits, and copies in China, of which a 16th-century example is in the Field Museum of Natural History in Chicago.

Pontifical approbations 

The image has been venerated by several Popes and acted as a Roman Catholic Mariological symbol for the city of Rome and its people.

 Pope Gregory I —  in 593 had the icon carried throughout Rome during the Easter festivals and prayed for an end to a plague at that time.
 Pope Pius V — in 1571 to pray for victory at the Battle of Lepanto
 Pope Gregory XVI — also venerated the image in 1837 to pray for the end of the cholera epidemic. Gergory XVI would crown the image a year later on 15 August 1838, the Marian feast of the Assumption whilst issuing his Papal bull Cælestis Regina.
  Pope Pius XII — honored the image in the following occasions:
 Celebrated his first Catholic mass at the Borghese chapel of the icon on Easter Sunday, 2 April 1899. 
 Issued a pontifical decree of coronation to the image on 11 October 1954. He later carried out the rite of coronation in person without a proxy on 1 November 1954, and ordered the image into Saint Peters Basilica to accompany his personal speech and the papal encyclical Ad Cæli Reginam, which also established the feast of the Queenship of the Blessed Virgin Mary. 
 Pope John Paul II — highlighted its iconography during the World Youth Day for the Jubilee Year of 2000.  
 Pope Benedict XVI — also venerated the image on various occasions under that specific Marian title. 
 Pope Francis — undertook the task of restoring and conserving the image, and celebrated a pontifical Mass in her honor on 28 January 2018 on the anniversary of the icon's translation to its new permanent shrine. In 2020 Francis presented the icon during an extraordinary Urbi et Orbi blessing.

Restoration
In 2017, the Vatican Museum was tasked with the full restoration and conservation process of the venerated image. The restoration process included the following conservations:

 Refilling of insect holes and various damage to the image, to the mantle, faces and background.
 The restoration of its golden halo, from the corroded red lacquer (oxidized).
 The brightening of the faces of the image, re-highlighting its facial structures.
 The repainting of the hands  and forehead cross, once obscured by gemstones and various ornaments.
 The restoration of the mantle to its indigo blue paint and its diagonal checkered border.
 The varnishing of the back of the image, strengthening its original frame.

The process was completed within a year and was given the honor of a Pontifical Mass by Pope Francis on 28 January 2018, on the anniversary of the translation of the icon to its new permanent shrine.

In the Schoenstatt Movement 

Salus Populi Romani is also said to be the source of the title Mater ter Admirabilis (Mother Thrice Admirable) used for the Blessed Virgin Mary within the Schoenstatt Marian Movement.

Salus Populi Romani was the centerpiece of the Colloquium Marianum in Ingolstadt, in 1604. According to the Schoenstatt, on 6 April 1604, Father Jakob Rem, SJ, desired to know which of the invocations from the Litany of Loreto would please the Virgin Mary the most. He reported that after meditation and looking at the image of Salus Populi Romani, the title Mother Thrice Admirable was revealed to him.

The title Mother Thrice Admirable has since become part of the Schoenstatt Movement and is also associated with another well known Madonna, namely the 1898 Refugium Peccatorum Madonna by the Italian artist Luigi Crosio which was purchased by the Schoenstatt Sisters in Switzerland in 1964 and has since been called the Mother Thrice Admirable Madonna.

See also 
 Our Lady of Šiluva
 Maria Advocata (Madonna del Rosario)

Notes

Further reading 
 K Noreen, "The icon of Santa Maria Maggiore, Rome: an image and its afterlife in Renaissance Studies, 2005.
 Wolf, Garhard. "Salus populi Romani", Die Geschichte römischer Kultbilder im Mittelalter 1990, - VCH, Acta Humaniora
 Wolf, Gerhard. “Icons and Sites: Cult Images of the Virgin in mediaeval Rome.” In Images of the Mother of God: Perceptions of the Theotokos in Byzantium'', ed. Maria Vassilaki, 23–49. Aldershot, England and Burlington, VT: Ashgate, 2005.

External links
Short video of the 1954 Canonical Coronation, commentary in Italian.
Video of the 2017 restoration of the icon by the Vatican Museum.

Byzantine icons
Paintings of the Madonna and Child
Pope Pius XII Mariology
S
Books in art